The Tappan were a Lenape people who inhabited the region radiating from Hudson Palisades and New York – New Jersey Highlands in at the time of European colonialization in the 17th century.

Etymology
The exonym Tappan is likely a derivation of a word or phrase from the Algonquian language Lenape as used by settlers to New Netherland, who spelled it as Tappaen. It is not certain what the Tappan called themselves, but there are a variety of interpretations for the word. One suggestion is that it possibly comes from tuphanne meaning cold water.

Vriessendael, one of the first "bouweries", or homesteads, built in the territory was sometimes called Tappan.
The Tappan are recalled throughout their former territory: Lake Tappan is a reservoir on the Hackensack River; the Tappan Zee, widening of the Hudson River and the bridge crossing it; Old Tappan in Bergen County; Tappan in Rockland County.

History
The Tappan migrated seasonally and engaged in companion planting, hunting, fishing, and trapping. Like the other natives who circulated in the region and whose territory overlapped, the Hackensack, Acquackanonk and Rumachenanck (later called the Haverstraw). The Tappan were of the Turtle Clan and spoke the Unami dialect of Lenape. The Tappan and the Hackensack actually were but one tribe and members of it were called either by one name or another according to their dwelling place. They, as well as the Raritan, Wappinger, Manhattan (also known as "Manhattoe"), were collectively known as the River Indians. Those groups living in the adjoining highlands to the west and north have become known as the Munsee.

Contact with the European settlers was at first as trading partners. It is from them that David de Vries purchased the land (1640) to build the homestead at Vriessendael (Edgewater) and, living among them, became an advocate of learning more about indigenous culture. It was an early Director of New Netherland, William Kieft, who attempted to exact tribute from them (but was ignored), and later allowed a number of them to be slaughtered after they had sought safety at Pavonia (1643), beginning a Kieft's War.

See also
Exonym and endonym

References

External links
Delaware Indian Tribe Clans
Science Forum Index  »  Anthropology Forum  »  Coastal American Aboriginal People
Delaware Indian/Lenni Lenape
Delaware Tribe of Indians
Lenape Indian Fact Sheet

Lenape
Bergen County, New Jersey
Hudson County, New Jersey
People of New Netherland
Native American tribes in New Jersey
Native American history of New Jersey